Samira Marti (born 23 January 1994 in Liestal, Basel-Landschaft) is a politician of the Social Democratic Party of Switzerland. She became a National Councillor in December 2018.

Life and career
Marti grew up in the village of Ziefen in the canton of Basel-Landschaft. She studied economics at the University of Zurich. Before she sat in Parliament, she worked part-time as a waitress.

In December 2018, she became a National Councillor for Basel-Landschaft after the resignation of Susanne Leutenegger Oberholzer. At the age of 24, she was the second youngest ever member to take office in the National Council after Pascale Bruderer (who was two months younger than her). She was the youngest member of the National Council until the 2019 federal election.

After her first days in Parliament, she stated: "I knew the right-wing was the majority, but seeing with my own eyes these fifty-something people peacefully destroy our future by pushing a button was an exceptionally intense experience."

See also 
List of members of the Federal Assembly from the Canton of Basel-Landschaft

References

External links

Official website 

21st-century Swiss women politicians
21st-century Swiss politicians
Women members of the National Council (Switzerland)
Social Democratic Party of Switzerland politicians
People from Liestal
1994 births
Living people